Henry Walton may refer to:

Henry Walton (politician) (died 1896), New Zealand farmer and politician
Henry Walton (judge) (1768–1844), prominent citizen of Saratoga Springs, New York
Henry Walton (English painter) (1746–1813), English painter and art dealer
Henry Walton (American painter) (1804–1865), American artist active in Ithaca, New York

See also
George Henry Walton (1867–1933), Scottish architect and designer
Harry Walton (disambiguation)